Dania Ramirez (born November 8, 1979) is a Dominican actress. Her credits include the roles of Maya Herrera in Heroes, Alex in Entourage, and Blanca during the last season of The Sopranos on television.  Her film roles include Alex Guerrero in She Hate Me and Callisto in the feature film X-Men: The Last Stand. She portrayed Rosie Falta on Lifetime's Devious Maids from June 2013, until its cancellation in 2016. In July 2017, Ramirez joined the hit ABC series Once Upon a Time for its softly-rebooted seventh season in a starring role as Cinderella.

Early life 
Ramirez was born in Santo Domingo. At an early age, she decided to become an actress. As a young child, she would reenact telenovelas for her family. She was discovered by a modeling scout while working in a convenience store at the age of 15, and was offered a small part in a soda commercial. Later, she decided to pursue acting seriously and studied at the Actor's Workshop in New York City under Flo Greenberg.

At 16 years old, Ramirez started at Montclair State University, where her volleyball talents led her to be placed among the top five in career digs, digs/game, solo blocks and total blocks. She graduated in 2001. After graduation, Ramirez moved to Los Angeles to pursue her acting career.

Career

Music videos 
Ramirez has appeared in several music videos, including Jay-Z's Streets is Watching (1998), De La Soul's "All Good?" feat. Chaka Khan (2000), LL Cool J's "Hush" (2005; directed by her then fiancé Jessy Terrero), Santana's "Into the Night" (2007), as well as "Cry Baby Cry" (a collaboration of Santana and Sean Paul). Ramirez appeared in Wisin & Yandel's music video "Dime Qué Te Pasó", in which she played the main character, the wife and mother of a military man in Iraq who finds out her husband died at war. She was also featured in hip-hop group Sporty Thievz's video "Cheapskate" in 1998.

Films 
Ramirez appeared as an extra in the HBO film Subway Stories (1997), where she met filmmaker Spike Lee who would later cast her in the film She Hate Me (2004). She played older sister "Laurie" in the movie Fat Albert (2004). She was Callisto (one of The Omegas) in the comic book film X-Men: The Last Stand (2006). She went on to star in The 5th Commandment, a film written by and starring Rick Yune, in 2008. In 2012, Ramirez appeared in two films, playing Selena in American Reunion and a bicycle messenger in Premium Rush.

Television 

Ramirez appeared as the minor character Caridad in the final episodes of the television series Buffy the Vampire Slayer, and as Blanca Selgado, a recurring role during season six of The Sopranos.

Ramirez portrayed the character of Maya Herrera on the TV series Heroes.

Ramirez was a guest judge on episode five of Cycle 14 of America's Next Top Model.

Ramirez guest starred as Alex, an employee of Turtle's, who begins a relationship with Turtle in season seven on the TV series Entourage.

From 2013 to 2016, Ramirez had been part of the main cast of Devious Maids, which aired on the Lifetime network for four seasons. She portrayed Rosie Falta, one of the main characters and titular protagonists of the series.

In July 2017, Ramirez was cast as a series regular in the softly-rebooted final season of Once Upon a Time. She portrayed Jacinda Vidrio, the real-world counterpart of the series' second iteration of Cinderella. In 2018, Ramirez was cast in another fairytale-themed drama, Tell Me a Story for CBS All Access. Ramirez played Hannah Perez, loosely based on Gretel from Hansel and Gretel.

As of 2023, she stars in Alert: Missing Persons Unit, which premieres on Fox on January 8. Her casting was announced in August 2022.

Other media 

Ramirez has appeared in several magazine spreads. She has also been listed in several of the world's top publications' "Sexiest Ladies of the Year" lists. In 2009, she was added to the roster of models for CoverGirl Cosmetics. In January 2010, Ramirez and Queen Latifah launched the company's "Clean Makeup for Clean Water Campaign".

Personal life 
Dania dated Soul Plane director Jessy Terrero until 2008. She became engaged in September 2011 to director John Beverly "Bev" Land. The couple married on the beach in Punta Cana, Dominican Republic on February 16, 2013. Land has a son, Kai Miles, with former wife Sharon Leal.

On July 15, 2013, Ramirez announced that she was pregnant with twins. That December, she gave birth to fraternal boy-girl twins.

Filmography

Film

Television

Accolades

See also 

 List of people from the Dominican Republic

References

External links 
 

1979 births
Living people
American film actresses
American television actresses
American voice actresses
American people of Dominican Republic descent
Dominican Republic emigrants to the United States
Hispanic and Latino American actresses
Mixed-race Dominicans
Montclair State University alumni
People from Santo Domingo
20th-century American actresses
21st-century American actresses